Walking Like We Do is the second studio album by British indie rock band The Big Moon, released on 10 January 2020 via Fiction Records. The album was recorded in Studio BTS, Atlanta by Ben H. Allen III.

Track listing

Personnel
Credits adapted from Walking Like We Do liner notes.

The Big Moon
Juliette Jackson - vocals, guitars, keyboards, flute (tracks 7 and 9), piano (track 10)
Soph Nathan - vocals, guitars, bass
Celia Archer - vocals, keyboards, piano, bass
Fern Ford - vocals, keyboards, drums, trumpet (track 1)

Additional musicians
Ben H. Allen III - additional keyboards, percussion
Richard Sherrington - horns
Rob Opitz - horns

Production
Ben H. Allen III - production, mixing
Ben Etter - mixing, engineering
Billy Halliday - additional engineering (track 8)
Duncan Albert Jr. - assistant engineering
Ian Horrocks - assistant engineering
Parker Bradford - assistant engineering
Rafael Rojas - assistant engineering
Spencer Poole - assistant engineering
Trae Young - assistant engineering
Pooneh Ghana - photography

Charts

See also
 List of 2020 albums

References

The Big Moon albums
2020 albums
Fiction Records albums
Albums produced by Ben H. Allen